Susan King may refer to:

Susan King (novelist) (born 1951), American writer
Susan King (Texas politician) (born 1952), American politician
Susan King Borchardt (born 1981), American basketball player
Rachel Berman (1946–2014), Canadian painter born Susan King
Susan E. King (born 1947), book artist and writer
Susan Petigru King (1824–1875), socialite, realist and novelist
Susan Te Kahurangi King (born 1951), New Zealand artist
Susan King (journalist)